Orlando Rodrigues (13 August 1932 – 2000) was a Portuguese sailor. He competed in the Flying Dutchman event at the 1968 Summer Olympics.

References

External links
 

1932 births
2000 deaths
Portuguese male sailors (sport)
Olympic sailors of Portugal
Sailors at the 1968 Summer Olympics – Flying Dutchman
Sportspeople from Luanda